Lǐ Yuán bà (李元霸) (599年－614年) was Tang Gaozu's fourth son, courtesy name Dàdé (大德). He was born by Lady Dou. He died in 614 after being struck on the head by his own weapon. After the establishment of the Tang dynasty, he was posthumously created Prince Huai of Wei. He died sonless, so Li Tai, son of his elder brother Li Shimin, was created his heir as Prince of Qing. When Li Shimin became emperor, he renamed Li Tai as his own son and created another clansman Li Baoding as heir to Li Yuanba. After Baoding died, also sonless, the Principality of Wei was cancelled.

599 births
614 deaths
Deaths by horse-riding accident
Sui dynasty people
7th-century Chinese people